Book of Travels is a role-playing video game currently under development by Might and Delight for Windows, Mac, and Linux through Steam. The early access version of the game was originally scheduled to be released in October 2020, but it was postponed four times. The early access version was ultimately released on October 11, 2021. Unlike massively multiplayer online role-playing games (MMORPGs), Book of Travels limits the number of players on each server to "make each meeting memorable when players cross paths" and "create a unique role-playing experience."

Gameplay 
Book of Travels is described as a "social role-playing experience that doesn't hold your hand." Unlike many RPGs, Book of Travels has no overarching goals, beginnings, or ends and pushes the player to create their own journey. Unlike many RPGs, the game focuses on role-playing, exploration, and personality rather than stats and numbers.

Plot 
Players begin their journey in the fantasy world called Braided Shore. Players create characters with various aspects such as star sign, backstory, and personality traits. From the outset, players set off to explore the land of their own will or find people to travel with. Players are able to gather resources, craft items, learn special abilities, with some aspects of combat.

Communication 
Player to player interaction is entirely non-text/verbal, relying on a limited set of emotes that are gained through player experience. The limitations on emotes is aimed at creating a richer, friendlier experience for players.

Navigation 
The main source of traversing Book of Travels is by walking/running through the game, however, there are alternative ways of travel including manually-powered rail carts.

Music 
Players will be able to play instruments together and collect new tunes.

Development 
The game was announced September 2019 at Tokyo Game Show, with a Kickstarter campaign announced for October 2019. The early access version of the game was scheduled to be released in October 2020, but it was postponed four times. The early access version was ultimately released on October 11, 2021.

Might and Delight has stated that they are committed to expanding the game over time, likening their role to a Dungeon Master, hinting at new scenarios that will be up to players to find on their own. Other content expansions hinted at were new levels and playable areas, characters and storylines and events.

Kickstarter 
Book of Travels development was funded by a successful Kickstarter campaign. After 2 weeks, Might and Delight had successfully raised over 2,516,656 SEK ($261,000) from 7,034 supporters and had unlocked a number of stretch goals. By the end of the campaign, the developer had raised over $261,000 from more than 7,000. In addition to funding, Might and Delight also crowdfunded island concepts from fans to be integrated into the game.

Art Style 
The game follows a "hand-painted" artstyle.

Reception 
Before the completion of its Kickstarter campaign, Book of Travels received coverage from numerous outlets including Forbes, Gamasutra, and Rock Paper Shotgun. In May 2020, Wholesome Games featured Book of Travels in their Wholesome Direct.

Awards 
Received the "Projects We Love" Badge from Kickstarter.

Book of Travels was nominated for Best Long Feature Award at AMAZE 2020.

References 

Upcoming video games
Multiplayer video games
Role-playing video games
Kickstarter-funded video games
Video games developed in Sweden